Weightlifting was one of the sports contested at the 1971 Pan American Games in Cali, Colombia. In this edition, four sets of medals were awarded for each weight.

Men's competition

Press

Flyweight (– 52 kg)

Bantamweight (– 56 kg)

Featherweight (– 60 kg)

Lightweight (– 67.5 kg)

Middleweight (– 75 kg)

Light-heavyweight (– 82.5 kg)

Middle-heavyweight (– 90 kg)

Heavyweight (– 110 kg)

Super heavyweight (+ 110 kg)

Snatch

Flyweight (– 52 kg)

Bantamweight (– 56 kg)

Featherweight (– 60 kg)

Lightweight (– 67.5 kg)

Middleweight (– 75 kg)

Light-heavyweight (– 82.5 kg)

Middle-heavyweight (– 90 kg)

Heavyweight (– 110 kg)

Super heavyweight (+ 110 kg)

Clean and Jerk

Flyweight (– 52 kg)

Bantamweight (– 56 kg)

Featherweight (– 60 kg)

Lightweight (– 67.5 kg)

Middleweight (– 75 kg)

Light-heavyweight (– 82.5 kg)

Middle-heavyweight (– 90 kg)

Heavyweight (– 110 kg)

Super heavyweight (+ 110 kg)

Total

Flyweight (– 52 kg)

Bantamweight (– 56 kg)

Featherweight (– 60 kg)

Lightweight (– 67.5 kg)

Middleweight (– 75 kg)

Light-heavyweight (– 82.5 kg)

Middle-heavyweight (– 90 kg)

Heavyweight (– 110 kg)

Super heavyweight (+ 110 kg)

Medal table

References

1971
1971 Pan American Games